Murugashankari Leo is an accomplished Bharatanatyam artiste, teacher of Bharatantyam, theatre actor and research scholar. Bharatantyam is an ancient Indian classical dance form which is known for its beauty, grace and uniqueness. Murugashankari performs this art form Bharatanatyam, and has given many recitals across India and other countries. She runs an institution Kalai Koodam – Academy of Performing Arts in Chennai and Madurai, where training in Bharatanatyam is imparted. She is also trained in Carnatic music and Nattuvangam.

Shankari is also a trained Yoga Teacher of the Sivananda Tradition at the Meenakshi Ashram, Madurai.

Early life 

Murugashankari hails from a family of artistes. Her father Leo Prabu is a veteran dramatist, Television Personality and a yesteryear actor in Tamil movies who has played pivotal roles in a number of Tamil films like Rendum Rendum Anju, Naan Mahaan Alla, Annae Annae, Paer Sollum Pillai etc. He is the recipient of ‘Kalaimamani’, the highest state award by the government of Tamil Nadu for Tamil Theater. His achievements as an actor is well known in Tamil Nadu, India.

Education 

Murugashankari is an alumnus of Adarsh Vidyalaya Matriculation Higher Secondary School in Chennai and is a university rank holder in chemical engineering from Sri Venkateswara College of Engineering. She completed her Master of Fine Arts from Kalai Kaviri College of Fine Arts, Trichy. She has been awarded the junior research fellowship from UGC, India to pursue her PhD. She also holds a postgraduate diploma in business administration from Symbiosis, Pune.

Dance career 

According to the Guru-Shishya Parampara, Murugashankari started learning Bharatanatyam at the age of 5 from the legendary dance teacher ‘Kalaimamani’ K.J.Sarasa. Later, she completed her Arangetram (debut performance) under the guidance of the illustrious teacher ‘Kalaimamani’ Parvathi Ravi Ghantasala. A chemical engineer by education, Murugashankari made the conscious decision of pursuing her passion and following her dreams of becoming a full-time artiste. She completed her Masters in Bharatanatyam from the Bharathidasan University and is now a Research scholar.

Concert tours 

Murugashankari has performed in all major sabhas and prestigious dance festivals all over India and has presented her concerts in Malaysia, Singapore and Sri Lanka. A list of selected concerts:

Chidambaram Natyanjali
Mamallapuram dance festival by Tamil Nadu Tourism Department, 
Natarani Festival in Ahmedabad by Darpana and WZCC, 
Uday Shankar Festival in Kolkata, 
Thrice at Naada Neerajanam at Tirumala Tirupathi Devasthanam which was live telecasted across 30 countries in TTDC channel, 
Charity concerts in Kapar, Shah Alam and Penang, Malaysia 
Twice at SIFAS Music and Dance Festival at Singapore Indian Fine Arts Society, Singapore
Nalanda Nrithyotsava, Mumbai
Nrithyabharathi Dance Festival, India International Centre, New Delhi
Ninad Concert Series, Mumbai
Vasundharotsava, Mysore
 Cuttack International Dance festival, Cuttack, Orissa
 Kinkini Festival, Mumbai
 Natya Vizha by Dept. Of Art and Culture, Pondicherry
 SPRING FESTIVAL at India International Center, New Delhi
 Performed Solo and along with her students for Thirumarai Kalamandram, Jaffna, Sri Lanka
 PERUR NATYANJALI FESTIVAL, Coimbatore
 Navaratri Festival at the Madurai Meenakshi Amman Temple, Madurai
 National Music and Dance Festival at Panachikkad Sri Dakshina Mookambika Temple, Kottayam, Kerala

Awards and credentials 

Graded artiste of Chennai Doordarshan
NATYA KALA VIPANCHEE conferred by VIPANCHEE trust received from Dr. Balamuralikrishna for outstanding contribution to Indian classical dances.
NRITYA SHIROMANI by UTKAL YUVA SANSKRUTIK SANGH, Cuttack.
"WORLD DANCE DAY PURASKAR" by Natraj Music and Dance academy, Member of International dance council UNESCO, Visakhapatnam.
Parichay's NATIONAL EXCELLENCY AWARD 2012, from the Member of parliament, Lok Sabha, Odisha and the Hon'ble Minister of Culture and Tourism, Odisha
Was honoured with the title 'Naattiya Thilagam'  in Selangor, Malaysia.
Was Conferred the title NARTHANA SHIRONMANI by SALANGAI OLI TRUST, Chennai in 2012.
Was Selected to be promoted by TAMIL NADU IYAL ISAI NATAKA MANDRAM as one of the young talented dancers for the year 2006.
Best Performer Award from Parthasarathi Swami Sabha in 2012, during their 112th Year
Was selected as one of the best dancers in the SOUTH ZONE MUSIC AND DANCE CONFERENCE conducted by THE INDIAN FINE ARTS SOCIETY.

Motivational speaker

Murugashankari is also a motivational speaker. She has addressed gatherings of students in various Engineering and Law colleges, mainly motivating youngsters to follow their passion. She has also presented many lecture demonstrations to school and college students focussing on the beauty and glory of the ancient dance form Bharatanatyam. A few notable institutes where she was invited to speak are Delhi Public School, Guwahati, Tezpur Law College, TEDx SSN Engineering College, Raja College of Engineering and Technology at Madurai and Pandian Saraswathi Yadav Engineering College.

Theater actor 
Murugashankari played the lead in Stage Image's latest Tamil Drama Neruppu Kolangal. This play was very well received in Chennai, with articles in the press commending the play and Murugashankari's acting in it. This play incorporates in it, the classical dance and a song both rendered by Murugashankari which is its unique attraction.

References

http://www.kalaikoodam.org/ Official website
http://www.thehindu.com/features/friday-review/review-of-l-murugashankaris-dance-recital/article7180882.ece. Friday Review, The Hindu, Bangalore, 8 May 2015
http://www.newindianexpress.com/cities/chennai/A-Visually-Scintillating-Performance/2014/01/13/article1996996.ece. City Express, Supplement of The New Indian Express, Chennai, 13 Jan 2014
http://www.thehindu.com/news/cities/chennai/chen-arts/chen-dance/rhythmic-tribute-to-swati-tirunal/article4054156.ece. Friday Review, The Hindu, Chennai
http://www.thehindu.com/features/friday-review/music/kaleidoscope-of-art-forms/article2795707.ece. Friday Review, The Hindu, Tiruchirapalli
https://www.youtube.com/watch?v=yY79gWhO1sE. Performance Glimpse
https://web.archive.org/web/20140201220709/https://afternoondc.in/culture/a-sparkling-dance-festival/article_97497 Afternoon D&C, Mumbai
http://www.thehindu.com/todays-paper/tp-features/tp-fridayreview/celebration-of-dance/article5531273.ece. Friday Review, The Hindu, Andhra Pradesh, 3 Jan 2014
https://www.youtube.com/watch?v=PzDiSdGLlFs. TedX Talk Video of Murugashankari
https://www.youtube.com/watch?v=TtreP4M_3UM. Interview of Murugashankari in Kalaignar Television
https://www.youtube.com/watch?v=yBrgV0d8yZ0. Murugashankari featured in the News segment in Vasantham Television, Singapore
https://www.youtube.com/watch?v=ZsR3YT04CDE. Murugashankari featured in the show 'Talam-Indian Beat' in Vasantham Television, Singapore
https://web.archive.org/web/20160915160354/http://carnaticdarbar.com/review/2011/review_99.asp. Review/Report of one of Murugashankari's recitals.
http://www.thehindu.com/todays-paper/tp-features/tp-fridayreview/visually-pleasing/article6246365.ece. Murugashankari's performance review in Friday Review of THE HINDU, 25 July 2014.
http://www.thehindu.com/features/friday-review/review-of-l-murugashankaris-dance-recital/article7180882.ece. Murugashankari's performance review in Friday Review of THE HINDU, 7 May 2015.
http://www.newindianexpress.com/cities/chennai/The-Kuravanci-Key-to-Mass-Appeal/2015/05/12/article2809233.ece. A Report about Tamizharasi Kuravanci by Murugashankari and her disciple (students of Kalai Koodam) in the Indian Express on 12 May 2015.
http://www.thehindu.com/todays-paper/tp-features/tp-fridayreview/vasant-utsav-dance-festival/article7206987.ece. A Report about Tamizharasi Kuravanci by Murugashankari and her disciple (students of Kalai Koodam) in the FRIDAY REVIEW, THE HINDU, on 15 May 2015.
http://epaper.tamilmirror.lk/index.php?option=com_content&view=article&id=899:20150814&catid=35:epaper. Interview on Page 16.
https://www.youtube.com/watch?v=KZ0gYUSikIE&hd=1. Interview on Woman's Day for Dinamalar.com, a leading Web TV of the popular daily newspaper of Tamil Nadu Dinamalar.
http://www.thehindu.com/entertainment/dance/dance-is-lmurugasankaris-first-love-she-tells-her-story-about-how-her-father-leo-prabhu-the-renowned-dramatist-kept-her-motivated-against-all-odds/article19270933.ece. An article about L.Murugashankari's artitistic journey.
http://www.thehansindia.com/posts/index/Telangana/2017-08-08/Mesmerising-classical-dances/317480. An article about L.Murugashankari and team's performance at Shilparamam, Hyderabad.
http://timesofindia.indiatimes.com/city/hyderabad/an-ode-to-classical-dance-forms/articleshow/59955611.cms. An article about L.Murugashankari and team's performance at Shilparamam, Hyderabad, 8 Aug 2017.

Further reading 
http://www.artindia.net/murugashankari.html. Website featuring leading exponents of Bharatanatyam
http://features.kalaparva.com/2013/12/dance-like-thyself-murugashankari-leo.html. Interview in a Website which contains information of Indian classical dancers.

External links 

 https://web.archive.org/web/20140203094144/http://sriparthasarathyswamisabha.com/ Website for Parthasarathy Swami Sabha
 http://www.parvathiravighantasala.com/ Website for 'Kalaimamani' Parvathi Ravi Ghantasala
 https://www.youtube.com/watch?v=NfEYiN_AAxk. Interview of Murugashankari for Makkal Television

Bharatanatyam exponents
Performers of Indian classical dance
Indian dance teachers
Living people
1983 births
Indian female classical dancers
Dancers from Tamil Nadu
Artists from Chennai
Women artists from Tamil Nadu
21st-century Indian dancers
21st-century Indian women artists